Eleanor Geraldine Saukerson (née Beam; March 30, 1922 – October 22, 2005) was an American politician in South Dakota.

Born at Methodist Hospital in Omaha, Nebraska in 1922, she attended Benson High School. She moved to Chamberlain, South Dakota shortly after marrying Wilbur Saukerson in 1945. She served on the local school board and the South Dakota Housing Authority. From 1966 to 1991, she was the Brule County Register of Deeds. Between 1990 and 1994, Saukerson served on the South Dakota Senate. Her husband died in June 2001. Eleanor Saukerson moved to Aberdeen in 2003, and died there on October 22, 2005.

References

1922 births
2005 deaths
Women state legislators in South Dakota
Republican Party South Dakota state senators
People from Chamberlain, South Dakota
20th-century American politicians
20th-century American women politicians
21st-century American women